Cheng Chu Sian (born 1 March 1986 in Kuala Lumpur) is an athlete from Malaysia, who competes in archery.

2008 Summer Olympics
At the 2008 Summer Olympics in Beijing Cheng finished his ranking round with a total of 660 points. This gave him the 26th seed for the final competition bracket in which he faced Matthew Gray of Australia in the first round, 109-101. With a win over Matti Hatava of Finland (110-103) he qualified for the third round and there he faced Lee Chang-Hwan of South Korea. Both archers scored 105 points in the regular match and had to go to an extra round. Here Cheng advanced with 19 points, while Lee hit 18 points. In the quarter finals Cheng was unable to beat Bair Badënov of Russia (109-104). Badënov went on to win the bronze medal.

Together with Wan Khalmizam and Muhammad Marbawi he also took part in the team event. With the 660 score from the ranking round combined with the 675 of Khalmizam and the 659 of Marbawi, Malaysia were in third position after the ranking round, which gave them a straight seed into the quarter finals. With 218-213 they were however eliminated by the Italian team that eventually won the silver medal.

2012 Summer Olympics 
Cheng was less successful at the 2012 Summer Olympics, being knocked out by teammate Khairul Anuar Mohamad in the first knockout round.  The Malaysian team also lost in the first round, to Mexico.

References

External links
 
 

1986 births
Living people
Malaysian people of Chinese descent
Malaysian male archers
Archers at the 2008 Summer Olympics
Archers at the 2012 Summer Olympics
Olympic archers of Malaysia
Sportspeople from Kuala Lumpur
Archers at the 2006 Asian Games
Archers at the 2010 Asian Games
Commonwealth Games medallists in archery
Commonwealth Games silver medallists for Malaysia
Southeast Asian Games gold medalists for Malaysia
Southeast Asian Games medalists in archery
Archers at the 2010 Commonwealth Games
Competitors at the 2005 Southeast Asian Games
Asian Games competitors for Malaysia
Medallists at the 2010 Commonwealth Games